Ben Moor is a former American football coach. He was the 20th head football coach at Ottawa University in Ottawa, Kansas, serving for four seasons, from 1972 to 1975, and compiling a record of 18–19. In 1972, his team won the Mineral Water Bowl, defeating  by a score of 27–20. Moor was inducted into the Ottawa University Athletic Hall of Fame in 2000.

Head coaching record

References

Year of birth missing (living people)
Living people
Ottawa Braves football coaches
Ottawa Braves football players